Stone Key Partners is a boutique investment bank focused on the government and commercial technology sectors. The advisory services offered by the firm and by Stone Key Securities include mergers and acquisitions, exclusive sale transactions and divestitures, special committee and fairness opinion assignments, and capital markets advisory services.

Stone Key was founded in May 2008 and is led by Michael J. Urfirer, who has spent more than 30 years advising leading companies in the Aerospace and Defense Homeland Security, Cybersecurity, Enterprise Software, Information Technology and Communications Technology industries.

References

Anti-Terrorism Firm A-T Solutions for Sale. Reuters, June 20, 2012
Highly Respected Strategic M&A Advisors Announce Official Launch of Stone Key Partners. PR Newswire, March 23, 2008
The Dealscape According to Stone Key Partners. Reuters Dealzone, March 23, 2009
Stone Key Drives Defense Technology Dealmaking. Reuters, Feb 14, 2011
U.S. Scrutinizes Foreign Defense M&A.  Reuters, Sep 9, 2011

External links

Investment banks in the United States
Financial services companies established in 2008
Banks established in 2008